Amor Perfeito is an upcoming Brazilian telenovela produced and broadcast by TV Globo, that will premiere on 20 March 2023. Inspired by José María Sánchez-Silva's 1953 novel Marcelino, pan y vino, the telenovela is written by Duca Rachid, Júlio Fischer and Elisio Lopes Jr. It will star Camila Queiroz, Diogo Almeida, Mariana Ximenes and Thiago Lacerda.

Cast 
 Camila Queiroz as Maria Elisa Rubião "Marê"
 Diogo Almeida as Orlando Gouveia
 Mariana Ximenes as Gilda Rubião
 Thiago Lacerda as Gaspar Evaristo 
 Daniel Rangel as Júlio Goulart
 Carmo Dalla Vecchia as Érico Requião 
 Juliana Alves
 Bukassa Kabengele
 Carol Castro as Darlene Nogueira
 Allan Souza Lima as Father João
 Paulo Betti as Anselmo Evaristo
 Zezé Polessa as Cândida Evaristo
 Ana Cecília Costa as Verônica Goulart
 Isabel Fillardis as Aparecida Madureira
 Alan Rocha as Antônio Madureira
 Lucy Ramos as Lívia
 Maria Gal as Neiva Batista
 Tonico Pereira as Frei Leão
 Jorge Florêncio as Emanuel / Jesus
 Babu Santana as Father Severo
 Bruno Montaleone as Ivan Evaristo
 Iza Moreira as Tânia
 João Fernandes as Justino Madureira
 Antônio Pitanga
 Tony Tornado
 Analu Prestes as Olímpia
 Genézio de Barros
 Bárbara Sut as Nathalia Madureira
 Breno De Felippo as Ronaldo 
 Cristiane Amorim
 Glicério do Rosário
 Bernardo Berro as Father Donato "Papinha"
 Cyda Moreno
 Mestre Ivamar
 Bruno Quixotte
 Gustavo Arthiddoro
 Blaise Musipere
 Raquel Karro
 Kyvilin Pádilha as Nadir
 Levi Asaf as Marcelino / Domingos Gouveia Rubião
 Vitória Pabst as Clarinha Nogueira
 Ygor Marçal as Manoel Madureira
 Valentina Melleu as Aninha
 Davi Queiroz as Tobias Albuquerque

Guest stars 
 Paulo Gorgulho as Leonel Rubião
 Bruce Gomlevsky
 Karen Marinho as Maria Eugênia Rubião
 Pedro David as Rodrigo

Production 
In May 2022, Amor Perfeito was approved by TV Globo, under the working title Marcelino. Production began in January 2023 with casting, costume making, and the construction of the fictional São Jacinto set town at Globo Studios. Filming began that same month in São Paulo, with locations at Luz Station, Independence Park, and Martinelli Building. On 17 February 2023, the first teaser for the telenovela was released.

References

External links 
 

Upcoming telenovelas